The Institute of Development Studies Kolkata (IDSK) is an autonomous research institute dedicated for development studies and related subfields in Bidhannagar, West Bengal, India. Established in 2002 as a centre of excellence in social sciences, the institute is funded by the Government of West Bengal and recognised by the Indian Council of Social Science Research (ICSSR).

History 
The IDSK was set up in 2002 by the Government of West Bengal as an autonomous centre of excellence in social sciences. Economist Amiya Kumar Bagchi was appointed as its Founder Director; he was later bestowed with the designation of Emeritus Professor of Economics at the institute.

The multidisciplinary MPhil in Development Studies course at the institute was introduced in 2006, while the PhD in Development Studies course started in 2016, both under the auspices of the University of Calcutta.

In 2014, IDSK was recognised by the Indian Council of Social Science Research (ICSSR) under the 'New Category of ICSSR Recognized Institutes'.

Collaborations 
IDSK has collaborated with the following institutions:

 University of Calcutta: The M.Phil and PhD programme is offered by IDSK in collaboration with the Centre for Social Sciences and Humanities of the University of Calcutta; the degrees are conferred by the University. The two institutions have jointly set up the Rabindranath Tagore Centre for Human Development Studies (RTCHDS).
 Department of Economics, University of Siena
 Monash University
 School of Public Affairs, Zhejiang University
 Roma Tre University

Scholars like Amartya Sen and Joseph Stiglitz have been associated with the institute.

Departments 
IDSK has 6 departments:

 Department of Development Studies
 Department of Regional Development
 Department of Economics
 Department of History
 Department of Sociology and Anthropology
 University Library

See also
Education in India

References

External links
 Official website

Research institutes in Kolkata
Research institutes in West Bengal
University of Calcutta affiliates
Educational institutions established in 2002
Social science institutes
2002 establishments in West Bengal